Beaver Lake is a lake in South Dakota, in the United States.

Beaver Lake was once a natural habitat of the North American beaver, hence the name.

See also
List of lakes in South Dakota

References

Lakes of South Dakota
Lakes of Minnehaha County, South Dakota